Carl Theodor Ottmer (19 January 1800, Braunschweig – 22 August 1843, Berlin) was a German architect.

Life 

He was the son of Johann Heinrich Gottfried Ottmer (1767–1814), a surgeon, and his second wife Elisabeth. He began his architectural training in 1816 at the Collegium Carolinum (now the Braunschweig University of Technology) and served an apprenticeship in the building department of the Duchy of Brunswick. He was soon promoted and, from 1817 to 1821, received training from the Senior Architect, Peter Joseph Krahe. In 1822, he went to Berlin for further studies at the Bauakademie, where he was under the direction of Karl Friedrich Schinkel. While there he became good friends with  Carl Friedrich Zelter, leader of the Sing-Akademie zu Berlin. This friendship eventually led to the construction of a permanent building for that group. 

He later refused an appointment as Court Architect in Berlin and spent the years 1827 to 1829 travelling through France and Italy. Upon his return, he married Cäcilie Abich (1808-1866).

After a major fire virtually destroyed the Brunswick Palace in 1830, he became the Court Architect for Braunschweig. In this capacity, he restored the palace and worked on many administrative, military and public projects. His style varied from Classical to Gothic, depending on the task at hand.

His last project, the Braunschweiger Bahnhof (train station), could not be completed before his death. Suffering from a lingering illness, he went to Berlin seeking a cure and died there. The station was completed from his plans (now lost) in 1845.

Major projects 

1823–1824: Berlin, Königsstädtisches Theater on the Alexanderplatz. (Demolished in 1932)
1825–1827: Berlin, Berliner Singakademie, in consultation with Karl Friedrich Schinkel. Since 1952, it has been known as the Maxim Gorki Theatre.
1829–1831: Meiningen, Herzogliches Hoftheater. (Destroyed by fire in 1908)
1830–1838: Braunschweig, Brunswick Palace. (Severely damaged in World War II. Demolished and partially rebuilt in 1960. Façade reconstructed in 2006/2007 using salvaged parts)
1835: Wolfenbüttel, Theater in the Schloß Wolfenbüttel. (Closed in 1903, later converted into classrooms)
1838–1841: Fallersleben infantry barracks. (in Florentine style)
1839: Braunschweig: Villa von Bülow, now home to the Georg-Eckert-Institut für internationale Schulbuchforschung ( Institute for International Textbook Research)

References

Further reading 
Gerd Biegel, Angela Klein : Carl Theodor Ottmer 1800–1843. Braunschweigischer Hofbaumeister – Europäischer Architekt. Ausstellungskatalog zum 200 Geburtstag im Braunschweigischen Landesmuseum, Braunschweig 2000.
Peter Giesau: Carl Theodor Ottmer. Braunschweiger Hofbaurat zwischen Klassizismus und Historismus. Deutscher Kunstverlag, Munich 1997, .
Rainer Theobald: Carl Theodor Ottmer als Theaterarchitekt. Untersuchungen zur Entstehung und Wirkung von Theaterbauten in der Epoche des Biedermeier. Dissertation, Freie Universität Berlin 1976.
 Dieter Ullmann: Chladni und Ottmer - ein frühes Beispiel für die Zusammenarbeit von Akustiker und Architekt. in: Acustica 71. 1990, Vol. 1, S. 58–63.
 Monika Lemke-Kokkelink: Wege zu Ottmer / 60 Stationen von Ahlum bis Zorge / Ein Führer zu den erhaltenen Bauten des Architekten Carl Theodor Ottmer (1800–1843), zu Stationen seines Lebens und zu Bauten seiner wichtigsten Schüler und Mitarbeiter zum 200. Geburtstag im Jahr 2000. Udo Gebauhr, Meyer, Braunschweig 2000, .

External links 

Memory Network: Biography
 

1800 births
1843 deaths
People from Braunschweig
People from the Duchy of Brunswick
Technical University of Braunschweig alumni
19th-century German architects